Strange Times: The Ghost in the Girl is a science fiction young adult novel created by Tom DeLonge, current co-lead vocalist/guitarist of Blink-182 and Angels & Airwaves, and novelist Geoff Herbach. The book was released on October 4, 2016 through DeLonge's To the Stars company. It's the first part of a planned trilogy of novels and follows the 2015 graphic novel Strange Times: The Curse of Superstition Mountain. 

DeLonge describes the book as being loosely based on his childhood. He said, "This is a story reflecting some of the peripheral moments in my life. Of a suburban kid who grew up breaking rules, getting kicked out of high school, and obsessively looking for the more unusual and imaginative experiences that this world has to offer."

Synopsis 
Former athlete Charlie Wilkins and a group of eighth-grade outcasts—Wiz who loves science, Riley who comes from a broken home, and skaters Mouse and Mattheson—try to solve the mystery of his missing father, a member of the US Air Force who vanishes during a secret mission. The boys are visited by a ghost girl who needs their help and is also connected to Charlie's family.

Adaptation 
In 2017, DeLonge announced he would make his directorial debut with a film based on his Strange Times series, co-written by Ben Kull. Stan Spry and Eric Woods from The Cartel and Russell Binder from Striker Entertainment were attached to the project as producers, while Angels & Airwaves was expected to compose new music for the film's score. However, a year later in 2018, the project evolved into a TV show for TBS. DeLonge described his vision for the show as a "science fiction Disney" and hopes to create a soundtrack with music from his favorite punk bands including the Descendents and Bad Religion.

References 

2016 American novels
Simon & Schuster books